The Uda is a river in Khabarovsk Krai, in the Russian Far East.

Geography
The Uda flows into the Sea of Okhotsk near the small town Chumikan. It rises south of the eastern Stanovoy Mountains and flows roughly eastwards. It borders the northern side of the Dzhagdy Range. In its lower course it flows close to the northwestern side of the Taikan Range into the Uda Gulf of the Sea of Okhotsk near the Shantar Islands. Lake Bokon is located in the lower basin of the river.

Tributaries

History
From the Treaty of Nerchinsk (1689) to the Treaty of Aigun (1858) its lower course was officially part of the border between Russia and China, although the border was not clearly marked and the area rarely visited. Some of Ivan Moskvitin's men reached the Uda in 1640. The local Lamuts told them of the rivers Zeya and the Amur but would not guide them inland. In 1684 some Cossacks fled from the Manchus on the Zeya, reached Udsk, and went up the Maya to Yakutsk.

There were suggestions to move Okhotsk south to Udsk but this was rejected because of the poor harbor and the proximity of the Chinese border. There were generally about 10 peasant families around the fort trying to produce grain and a few thin cattle, but results were poor. Sometimes seed corn had to be imported. A pood of rye flour that cost half a ruble at Irkutsk cost 8 to 10 rubles at Udsk. The population was 30 in 1690, 200 in 1800 and 164 in 1865.

Yakutsk-Udsk Track: This was an ill-defined route used to supply Udsk from Yakutsk. It was open from April to October but there was some winter travel. It crossed the Amga River at Amginsk, the Aldan River at Kompaneisk and the Uchur River at Uchur Crossing. Pack horses were usually left at Udsk as food for sled dogs or people while the Yakut drivers returned to Yakutsk on foot or skis. In 1750 all the pack horses perished in deep snow resulting in starvation. In 1788 more than 100 horses drowned during the spring snowmelt.

See also
List of rivers of Russia

Notes 

Rivers of Khabarovsk Krai
Drainage basins of the Sea of Okhotsk